Siccone may refer to:

Pope John XVII (died 1003)
Bishop of Ostia (960-963)